Apruebo Dignidad (in English, Approve Dignity, AD) is a democratic socialist Chilean electoral coalition officially created on 11 January 2021, by the Broad Front and Chile Digno in preparation for the Constitutional Convention election.

History
The Apruebo Dignidad pact has its origins in the attempt to reunite the left into a large conglomerate. In the midst of the pandemic, there were various attempts to seek unity in the opposition. One of them was Popular Sheet, a platform that led left-wing political parties and movements with the intention of pushing left-of-centre economic proposals in Congress.

Its members include the Broad Front, Chile Digno, Social Unity Table, Community for Dignity, among other organizations. On 5 February 2021, the central principals of the coalition for the drafting of the New Constitution were defined. This event was attended by social and political figures such as Beatriz Sánchez, Fernando Atria, Bárbara Figueroa, Emilia Schneider, Bastián Bodenhöfer, Patricia López, Tatiana Urrutia, Marcos Barraza, Bárbara Sepúlveda Hales, and others.

After successful constituent elections, the parties confirmed a presidential primary and the formalization of the electoral coalition on 19 May, amid failed talks with the Socialist Party. These primaries summon the standard-bearer and current mayor of Recoleta, Daniel Jadue, who is supported by Chile Digno composed of the Communist Party and the Social Green Regionalist Federation, and also the Equality Party. On the other side was deputy Gabriel Boric, who was supported by the Broad Front as a whole.

On 18 July 2021, the primaries of Apruebo Dignidad were held, giving as the winner the militant of Social Convergence, Gabriel Boric, who represented the coalition in the presidential elections in November. Also, in the midst of talks, the possibility of the conglomerate forming a single list for the parliamentary elections was considered.

On Thursday, 12 August, the conglomerate launched the Constituent Observatory Apruebo Dignidad, a think tank that brings together four study centers of parties and movements that are members of the coalition: Saberes Colectivos (Broad Front), Rumbo Colectivo (Democratic Revolution), La Casa Común (Common Force) and the Alejandro Lipschutz Institute of Sciences (Communist Party). The main objective of the project is the need to forge links between the Constitutional Convention and civil society for the monitoring and lifting of constitutional proposals, in addition to strengthening relations between the parties and movements that make up Apruebo Dignidad.

On 11 August, the parliamentary list of Apruebo Dignidad was formalized, composed of the parties and movements of the conglomerate that have parliamentary representation (RD, CS, Comunes, Unir, PC, FREVS, AH). The objective of the bench was to improve parliamentary coordination in debates in Congress in the future; such as the 40-hour law, the tax on the super rich, among others. Likewise, the event ratified the support for Gabriel Boric's candidacy for the presidency. The Equality Party decided not to support Boric and raise a parallel parliamentary list with the Humanist Party called Dignidad Ahora.

2021 presidential election 
Boric obtained 25.83% of the votes in the first round of the presidential election, securing his place in a run-off against José Antonio Kast of the Christian Social Front, who received 27.91% of the preferences. In the second round, that took place on 19 December, he won 55.87% of the votes, becoming president-elect of Chile. He was sworn in on 11 March 2022.

On September 24, 2022, through a statement it was reported that the Common Force political movement became part of the Social Convergence party .

Composition

Former members

Election results

Presidential elections

Constitutional Convention

Congress election

References

2021 establishments in Chile
Left-wing political party alliances
Political parties established in 2021
Political party alliances in Chile